Troitsk is a town in Chelyabinsk Oblast, Russia, located  east of the southern Ural Mountains and approximately  south of Chelyabinsk on the border with Kazakhstan. It stands on the east-flowing Uy River, a branch of the Tobol River. Population:  83,862 (2002 Census);

Geography and climate
The Uy and Uvelka Rivers merge within the town boundaries and form a water body which serves as a reservoir for the nearby power station.

The landscape around the town is flat, although river valleys are hilly. The town is situated on the border of a forest-steppe zone. The climate is continental.

History

Troitsk was founded in 1743 by Ivan Neplyuyev as a head fortress of the Orenburg Line of forts during the Bashkir War of 1735-1740 and to protect the southern borders of Russia. It played a major role in the rebellion of Pugachev, who besieged and captured the town in 1774.

Gradually from a military settlement Troitsk has grown into a trading town with well-developed industry and nascent tourism.

Administrative and municipal status
Within the framework of administrative divisions, Troitsk serves as the administrative center of Troitsky District, even though it is not a part of it. As an administrative division, it is incorporated separately as the Town of Troitsk—an administrative unit with the status equal to that of the districts. As a municipal division, the Town of Troitsk is incorporated as Troitsky Urban Okrug.

Economy
Troitsk serves as a railway junction and a supply and trading center for the southern Ural Mountains mining district. Through Troitsk trains pass to the Republic of Kazakhstan and further to the states of Central Asia. Other lines connect the Ural Mountains with the southern regions of Russia.

Near Troitsk are deposits of clay, sand, quartzite, granite, and rubble, used by the town's construction industry. The Russia-Kazakhstan border is immediately south of Troitsk (see photograph). Several large, cultivated field patterns (elongated, rectangular shapes) are visible through the snow-covered landscape, probably planted with spring wheat. Numerous circular, frozen lakes are scattered throughout the countryside around Troitsk.

The area in the Southern Urals has significant industrial potential. Capacity of the Troitsaya GRES coal-fired power station is around 2000 Megawatts. Additional units with capacity of 660 Megawatt are being built. There is an electromechanical plant which makes heat transfer devices for powerful electric machines, a manufacturer of rockwool plates for Danish firm "Rockwool", a meat-packing plant, ferro-concrete products and parquet, a garment factory, and the railway and motor transportation enterprises. Small-scale businesses employ more than 6000 people.

Facilities
There are four higher educational institutions in Troitsk. Most significant of them is the Ural State Academy of Veterinary Medicine. About 5,000 students are trained there. Other higher educational institutions have branches in Troitsk.

Population

Culture
Various festivals, competitions, and concerts take place during the year.

Tourism
Troitsk is one of the few places in the Ural region where the historical environment is well preserved. There are 948 cultural and historical monuments. The city of Troitsk has 4 architectural sites of federal importance: Cathedral of the Holy Trinity (1754), passage Yausheva brothers Bashkirov hotel and shopping arcades.

References

Notes

Sources

External links

The official website of the town administration 
The Information site about a city, All city history, the directory 

Cities and towns in Chelyabinsk Oblast
Troitsky Uyezd
Kazakhstan–Russia border crossings